Lüttchendorf is a village and a former municipality in the Mansfeld-Südharz district, Saxony-Anhalt, Germany. Since 1 January 2010, it is part of the municipality Seegebiet Mansfelder Land.

History
The first documented mention of Lüttchendorf was as Luzilendorpf in the Hersfeld Tithe Register from the 880's.

Former municipalities in Saxony-Anhalt
Seegebiet Mansfelder Land